The Minister without portfolio was a member of the Albanian government who performed important administrative tasks but was not in charge of leading a select ministerial office or held a specific title. The minister and other subservient offices of the government carried out their duties in accordance with the general policies defined by the council of ministers.

History 
The post of the minister without portfolio can be traced back to 1918 with the second government of Turhan Pasha Përmeti. Known as the Government of Durrës, the members of this cabinet were labeled as delegates without portfolio. The post was officially instituted with the start of the Delvina Government on 30 January 1920. The first ministers to hold the post were Bajram Curri, Hysen Vrioni and Spiro Jorgo Koleka.

Officeholders (1920–present)
Only ministers who held the official title "Minister without portfolio" are ranked.

Notes

References

Albania
?